Loic Costerg (born  in Moûtiers) is a French bobsledder.

Costerg competed at the 2014 Winter Olympics for France. He teamed with brakeman Romain Heinrich in the two-man event, finishing 20th, and in the France-1 sled with Florent Ribet, Heinrich and Elly Lefort in the four-man event, finishing 17th.

As of April 2014, his best showing at the World Championships is 17th, in the 2013 two-man event.

Costerg made his World Cup debut in December 2013. As of April 2014, his best finish is 14th, in 2013–14 at Park City.

References

1987 births
Living people
Olympic bobsledders of France
Sportspeople from Savoie
Bobsledders at the 2014 Winter Olympics
Bobsledders at the 2018 Winter Olympics
French male bobsledders